Hipódromo is one of the forty subbarrios of Santurce, San Juan, Puerto Rico.

Demographics
In 2000, Hipódromo had a population of 2,017.

In 2010, Hipódromo had a population of 1,523 and a population density of 15,230 persons per square mile.

See also 
 
 List of communities in Puerto Rico

References

Santurce, San Juan, Puerto Rico
Municipality of San Juan